Real Asiento de Inglaterra or Real Asiento de la Gran Bretaña, was the name in Spanish of the subsidiary in Buenos Aires of the South Sea Company. In 1713, the British Crown established the asiento in the current Plaza San Martín, neighborhood of Retiro.

History 

After the Treaty of Utrecht, Spain granted the monopoly of the slave trade to Great Britain. The South Sea Company was established in Buenos Aires around 1713, during the reign of Philip V of Spain and Anne of Great Britain. The treaty of 1713 included the annual introduction of 1,200 slaves to the port of Buenos Aires, mostly to be sent to the cities of Córdoba and Lima. The main directory of the Royal Seat of Great Britain arrived in the Río de la Plata on board the warship H.M.S. Warwick in September 1715.

In 1718, Thomas Dover, president of the Real Asiento de Inglaterra of Buenos Aires, acquired the luxurious residence belonging to Miguel de Riglos. This residence had originally been owned by the Governor of Buenos Aires Agustín de Robles y Lorenzana. After acquiring that property, Riglos rent it to the Compagnie Royale de Guinée.

Several families belonging to the Buenos Aires society maintained commercial ties (sale of leather) with the Real Asiento de Inglaterra as Adrián Pedro Warnes, Francisco Rodríguez de Vida and Dionisio Chiclana Navarro. Joseph de Esparza, Miguel Gerónimo de Esparza and Juan de la Palma y Lobatón were some of the authorities of the Spanish government in charge of the control of the activities of the South Sea Company in Buenos Aires.

The South Sea Company operated in the Río de la Plata until 1739, year in which Spain declared war against Great Britain. In those lands was built the Plaza de Toros del Retiro in 1800. In the ships of Real Asiento de Inglaterra arrived at the Río de la Plata, Robert Young, Robert Fontaine and Robert Espren, pioneers in the practice of medicine of colonial Buenos Aires.

Directory 
 Thomas Dover, president
 Juan Thruppe, president since 1722
 Roberto Cross, directory
 Benito Thistlethwayte, directory
 Joseph de Lannoy, directory 
 Guillermo Helps, directory
 Jeremías Mount, accountant
 Juan Mylan, surgeon
 Miguel Antonio de Merlos, notary in 1716

Gallery

References 

History of South America
Río de la Plata